Soyuz TMA-18M was a 2015 Soyuz spaceflight to the International Space Station. It provided the two twelve-months occupants (Scott Kelly and Mikhail Korniyenko) at the International Space Station with a fresh Soyuz capsule. TMA-18M was the 127th flight of a Soyuz spacecraft; the first having occurred in 1967. The ascent flight consisted of a Russian commander and two flight engineers from Denmark (ESA) and Kazakhstan respectively. The flight launched in September 2015 and returned to Earth in March 2016.

The Kazakh Aidyn Aimbetov is of the first Kazakh cosmonaut class, and the first to fly. The ESA astronaut Andreas Mogensen became the first Dane in space.

The descent crew was the same Russian commander and the two twelve-months occupants in March 2016. Two of the ascent crew members returned to Earth with Soyuz TMA-16M in September 2015.

Crew

Backup crew

Space tourist in the third seat
Originally the third member should have been the British singer Sarah Brightman as a space tourist, but on May 13, 2015, she announced she had withdrawn from training.

Japanese entrepreneur Satoshi Takamatsu trained as Sarah Brightman's backup, but he withdrew from the flight as the art projects he had planned to carry out would not be ready by the September launch date. He stated he would try for a later flight when his projects were ready to fly.

Russian businessman Filaret Galchev was offered the seat, but he realized that he didn't have the time to prepare himself for the flight.

Roscosmos chose the Kazakh cosmonaut Aidyn Aimbetov as an alternative instead.

Landing
The spacecraft successfully landed on 2 March 2016 04:26 UTC, returning the ISS year long mission crew.

Later use 
Today the spent Soyuz TMA-18M capsule is on display at the Danish Museum of Science & Technology in Elsinore.

See also

 2015 in spaceflight

References

External links

Crewed Soyuz missions
Spacecraft launched in 2015
2015 in Russia
Spacecraft which reentered in 2016
Spacecraft launched by Soyuz-FG rockets